NORAD is the North American Aerospace Defense Command, a United States/Canada military alliance.

NORAD or Norad may also refer to:

 Norwegian Agency for Development Cooperation
 NORAD (board game), a 1970s war simulation game
 Noradrenaline or norad, a hormone and a neurotransmitter
 EHC Hoensbroek or EHC Hoensbroek Norad, a Dutch football club
 Norad Mill, North Adams, Massachusetts, on the US National Register of Historic Places

See also